Andrew Lawrence Nicholas (born May 17, 1981) is an American former professional basketball player. A  shooting guard, Nicholas was the leading scorer in the EuroLeague 2005–06 season, being awarded the Alphonso Ford Trophy. He is a two-time EuroLeague champion, winning in 2009 and 2011 with Panathinaikos.

High school
Born in Hempstead, New York, Nicholas played high school basketball at Long Island Lutheran, in New York, from 1995 to 1999.

College career
Nicholas played college basketball at the University of Maryland, College Park with the Maryland Terrapins from 1999 to 2003. In 2002, Nicholas helped Maryland win its first National Championship. He made the All-Atlantic Coast Conference 2nd Team in his senior season in college. His most memorable moment came in the 2003 NCAA Tournament when he hit a three-pointer at the buzzer to win a first-round game against UNC-Wilmington. He also hit a three-pointer at the buzzer to give coach Gary Williams his 500th career coaching victory against NC State.

Professional career
Nicholas was selected in the 2003 USBL Draft by the Texas Rim Rockers (59th overall). He then moved to Italy for the 2003–04 season, signed by Fabriano Basket, in the Italian LegADue (Italy's 2nd-tier level league). He led Legadue in scoring with 27.1 points per game that season. He was signed for the 2004–05 season by Basket Livorno. He led Italy's top-tier level LBA in scoring with 22.8 points per game. At the end of the Italian League's regular season, he moved to Spain, signed for the remainder of the season by TAU Ceramica. He then went back to Italy for the 2005–06 season, signed by Benetton Treviso. He led the EuroLeague in scoring with 18.4 points per game. He moved to Turkey for the 2006–07 season, signed by Efes Pilsen. In March 2008, he briefly negotiated with the Israeli Super League club Maccabi Tel Aviv, on a three-year contract offer, but he was unable to reach a final contractual agreement with the club.

On June 24, 2008, he signed a two-year contract with Greek club Panathinaikos. Nicholas helped Panathinaikos win the 2009 and 2011 EuroLeague championships. He also won the Greek Cup in 2009, as well as the Greek League championship in 2009, 2010, and 2011. In July 2011, he signed with Italian club Armani Jeans Milano. In January 2012, Nicholas was waived by Armani Jeans Milano.

In July 2012, after being a free agent for 7 months since his departure from AJ Milano, Nicholas signed a one-year contract with the Russian club CSKA Moscow.  However, on November 23, 2012, Nicholas reached an agreement to terminate his contract with the team, by mutual agreement. In July 2013, he officially announced his retirement from playing professional basketball, after having played his last game in 2012.

Post playing career
After he retired from playing professional basketball, Nicholas became a basketball analyst and sports commentator. In 2016 he joined the Minnesota Timberwolves as a scout.

Personal life
In February 2008, Nicholas refused to travel with Efes Pilsen for their away game against Partizan in Belgrade, due to a recommendation for U.S. citizens not to visit Serbia, which was related to the tension that was caused after the declaration of the independence of Kosovo. He was then banned from the club, and shortly after that he was released.

EuroLeague career statistics

|-
| style="text-align:left;"| 2005–06
| style="text-align:left;"| Benetton
| 20 || 17 || 33.8 || .479 || .457 || .827 || 2.8 || 2.7 || 1.1 || .1 || style="background:#CFECEC;"| 18.4 || 16.6
|-
| style="text-align:left;"| 2006–07
| style="text-align:left;"| Efes Pilsen
| 20 || 20 || 34.3 || .429 || .400 || .726 || 2.5 || 2.5 || 3.8 || .2 || 13.9 || 13.1
|-
| style="text-align:left;"| 2007–08
| style="text-align:left;"| Efes Pilsen
| 14 || 12 || 32.5 || .430 || .353 || .729 || 3.0 || 2.9 || 1.0 || .1 || 16.5 || 14.1
|-
| style="text-align:left;background:#AFE6BA;"| 2008–09†
| style="text-align:left;"| Panathinaikos
| 22 || 16 || 23.5 || .429 || .408 || .615 || 1.3 || 1.2 || 1.0 || .1 || 8.3 || 6.0
|-
| style="text-align:left;"| 2009–10
| style="text-align:left;"| Panathinaikos
| 16 || 15 || 27.6 || .433 || .410 || .667 || 1.2 || 2.2 || .9 || .2 || 10.5 || 7.9
|-
| style="text-align:left;background:#AFE6BA;"| 2010–11†
| style="text-align:left;"| Panathinaikos
| 20 || 6 || 23.0 || .437 || .415 || .600 || 1.1 || 1.7 || .4 || .1 || 9.8 || 6.1
|-
| style="text-align:left;"| 2011–12
| style="text-align:left;"| Milano
| 14 || 8 || 26.4 || .302 || .297 || .625 || 2.6 || 1.7 || .5 || .2 || 7.4 || 4.2
|-
| style="text-align:left;"| 2012–13
| style="text-align:left;"| CSKA Moscow
| 4 || 1 || 15.0 || .067 || .000 || .000 || .5 || .8 || .0 || .0 || .5 || -3.5
|- class="sortbottom"
| style="text-align:left;"| Career
| style="text-align:left;"|
| 130 || 95 || 28.2 || .422 || .391 || .737 || 2.1 || 2.3 || .8 || .1 || 11.8 || 9.4

References

External links
Euroleague.net Profile
FIBA Game Center Profile
Italian League Profile 
Spanish League Profile 
Turkish League Profile

1981 births
Living people
20th-century African-American people
21st-century African-American sportspeople
African-American basketball players
American expatriate basketball people in Greece
American expatriate basketball people in Italy
American expatriate basketball people in Russia
American expatriate basketball people in Spain
American expatriate basketball people in Turkey
American men's basketball players
Anadolu Efes S.K. players
Basket Livorno players
Basketball players from New York (state)
Fabriano Basket players
Greek Basket League players
Lega Basket Serie A players
Liga ACB players
Maryland Terrapins men's basketball players
Olimpia Milano players
Pallacanestro Treviso players
PBC CSKA Moscow players
Panathinaikos B.C. players
People from Hempstead (town), New York
Point guards
Saski Baskonia players
Shooting guards
Sportspeople from Nassau County, New York